Edward Ciągło (born 15 October 1953 in Gołkowice Dolne) is a Polish politician. He was elected to the Sejm on 25 September 2005, getting 9470 votes in 14 Nowy Sącz district as a candidate from the League of Polish Families list.

See also
Members of Polish Sejm 2005-2007

External links
Edward Ciągło - parliamentary page - includes declarations of interest, voting record, and transcripts of speeches.

1953 births
Living people
People from Stary Sącz
Movement for Reconstruction of Poland politicians
League of Polish Families politicians
Members of the Polish Sejm 2005–2007